Marie-Catherine de Villedieu, born Marie-Catherine Desjardins and generally referred to as Madame de Villedieu (1640 – 20 October 1683) was a French writer of plays, novels and short fiction. Largely forgotten or eclipsed by other writers of the period (such as Madame de La Fayette) in the works of literary historians of the 19th and 20th centuries, Madame de Villedieu is currently enjoying a literary revival.

Biography
Madame de Villedieu was born at Alençon, the second daughter of Guillaume Desjardins and Catherine Ferrand, who worked as a ladies' maid for the wife of duke Henri de Rohan-Montbazon. After the divorce of her parents in 1655 the fifteen-year-old girl was taken by her mother to Paris. She came under the protection of the duchess of Rohan (thanks to the poems she presented her). Louis XIV gave Madame de Villedieu a pension of 1500 livres. She was admitted to the Academy of the Ricovrati of Padua.  She died at Saint-Rémy-du-Val (Sarthe).

Madame de Villedieu was prolific in the genre of "nouvelles historiques" and "nouvelles galantes" which began to appear in France in the 1660s. An interest in love, psychological analysis, moral dilemmas and social constraints permeated these relatively short novels. When the action was placed in an historical setting, this was increasingly a setting in the recent past, and although still filled with anachronisms, these novels showed an interest in historical detail; these are generally called "nouvelles historiques". A number of these short novels recounted the "secret history" of a famous event, linking the action generally to an amorous intrigue; these were called "histoires galantes". Les Désordres de l’Amour is perhaps Madame de Villedieu's most well-known work in this genre.

Her masterpiece is perhaps the pseudo-memoir novel Mémoires de la vie d'Henriette-Sylvie de Molière, a remarkably realistic story (in the vein of a picaresque novel) recounting the economic and emotional misfortunes of a young woman in contemporary French society.

Along with her novels, she wrote three plays: the tragicomedy Manlius performed with critical success by the actors of the Hôtel de Bourgogne in 1662 (the play engendered a debate between Jean Donneau de Visé and François Hédelin, abbé d'Aubignac concerning its historical accuracy); the tragedy Nitétis performed April 27, 1663; and the tragicomedy Le Favori, performed April 24, 1665 at Théâtre du Palais-Royal in Paris and June 13, 1665 at Versailles.

She died at her manor in Clinchemore in 1683.

Quotation

Works and works available online (in French)

 Œuvres et éditions en ligne
 Alcidamie (1661)
 Les Amours des Grands Hommes (1671)
 Anaxandre. Nouvelle (1667)
 Les Annales galantes (1670)
 Les Annales galantes de Grèce (1687)
 Carmente, histoire grecque (1668)
 Cléonice ou le Roman galant. Nouvelle (1669)
 Les Désordres de l’amour (1675)
 Les Exilés (1672-1673)
 Fables ou Histoires allégoriques dédiées au roy, Claude Barbin, Paris (1670)
 Le Favori, tragi-comédie, [s.n.], Paris, Amsterdam (1666) ; 1re édition, Paris, Louis Billaine ou Thomas Jolly ou Guillaume de Luyne ou Gabriel Quinet (1665)
 Les Galanteries grenadines (1672-1673)
 Le Journal amoureux (1669-1671)
 Lettres et billets galants (1667)
 Lisandre. Nouvelle (1663)
 Manlius Torquatus, tragi-comédie, [s.n.], Paris (1662)
 Mémoires de la vie de Henriette-Sylvie de Molière (1672-1674)
 Mémoires du Sérail sous Amurat second (1670)
 Nitétis, tragédie, 1663
 Nouveau recueil de pièces galantes (1669)
 Les Nouvelles africaines (1673)
 Le Portefeuille (1674)
 Portrait des faiblesses humaines, Henry Desbordes, Amsterdam (1686) ; 1re édition, Paris, Claude Barbin (1685)
 Récit en prose et en vers de la farce des Précieuses] (1660)
 [http://gallica.bnf.fr/document?O=N109802 Recueil de poésies, Claude Barbin, Paris (1662)
 Recueil de quelques lettres et relations galantes (1668)

Notes

References 
 Studies on Mme de Villedieu, in French
 Manlius et Le Favori, éd. Henriette Goldwyn, in A. Evain, P. Gethner, H. Goldwyn (dir.), Théâtre de femmes de l'Ancien Régime, XVIIe siècle, Saint-Étienne, Publications de l'Université, 2008 [orth. et ponctuation modernisées, format poche].
 Micheline Cuénin, Roman et société sous Louis XIV : Madame de Villedieu (Marie-Catherine Desjardins 1640-1683), Paris, Champion, 1979, 2 t. ; en ligne sur le Site Madame de Villedieu, Copyright  Éditions Honoré Champion 2007
 Donna Kuizenga: Madame de Villedieu. In. Dictionary of Literary Biography (DLB). Vol. 268 (2002), pp. 383–390.
 Madame de Villedieu et le théâtre. Actes du colloque de Lyon (11 et 12 septembre 2008), Nathalie Grande et Edwige Keller-Rahbé (dir.), Biblio 17, vol. 184, 2009.
 Madame de Villedieu, ou les audaces du roman, Nathalie Grande et Edwige Keller-Rahbé (dir.), Littératures classiques, n° 61, printemps 2007.
 Madame de Villedieu romancière. Nouvelles perspectives de recherches Edwige Keller-Rahbé (dir.), Lyon, Presses universitaires de Lyon, 2004.
 Bruce Archer Morrissette, The life and works of Marie-Catherine Desjardins (Mme. de Villedieu) 1632-1683, Saint Louis, Washington University Studies, 1947.

External links 
 Site Madame de Villedieu
 Notice bio-bibliographique de Mme de Villedieu, par Donna Kuizenga (2004), pour le Dictionnaire des femmes de l’Ancienne France de la SIEFAR
 Les pièces de Marie-Catherine Desjardins et leurs représentations sur le site CÉSAR
Théâtre de femmes de l'Ancien Régime : extraits de pièces, présentation du théâtre de Mme de Villedieu, actualités sur son œuvre dramatique
 Her novel Mémoire de la vie de Henriette-Sylvie de Molière on Amazon.fr
 Marie Catherine Desjardins /Madame de Villedieu (1640?-1683) Other Women's Voices

1640 births
1683 deaths
Writers from Alençon
French women novelists
17th-century French women writers
17th-century French novelists
17th-century French dramatists and playwrights
French women dramatists and playwrights
French women short story writers
French short story writers